
Special Operations Craft – Riverine is a boat used by the United States Navy to perform short-range insertion and extraction of special operations forces in river and near-shore environments. It replaced the Patrol Boat, River, and the mini armored troop carrier.

Each SOC-R is crewed by four Special Warfare Combatant-craft Crewmen (SWCC) and can carry four more people. The craft are operated only by members of Special Boat Team 22 (SBT-22), based in Stennis, Mississippi. These river crews conduct mainly clandestine combat missions, often operating at night with little or no air support.

Designed for speed and tight turns, the SOC-R's V-shape belly allows the boat to skate along the surface, with relatively little drag on the hull. There is no hanging rudder or propeller blades to snag on submerged roots and rocks.

The SOC-R's five weapon mounts provide a 360-degree field of fire. The aft-mounted .50 cal covers the boat crew as they leave the shore after an extraction.

The SOC-R and its tractor and trailer fits aboard C-130 or larger aircraft. 

The craft can also be slung under an Army MH-47 helicopter using the MEATS system, which allows Combatant-Craft Crewmen to fast-rope from the helicopter onto the craft during insertion and climb a ladder from the boat to the helicopter during extraction.

Image gallery

See also
 
 Mark V Special Operations Craft
 Small unit riverine craft

References

External links
 United States Marine Inc. Web site
 Behind the Scenes With a Special Ops Gunboat Crew - Popular Mechanics article - March 2009

United States Navy SEALs
Equipment of the United States Navy
Unclassified miscellaneous vessels of the United States Navy
Military boats
Patrol vessels of the United States Navy
Riverine warfare
Landing craft